USS Richard Bulkeley was a minesweeping trawler leased from the British Royal Navy. Built as HMT Richard Bulkeley, the ship was a  trawler, purpose-built for service with the Auxiliary Patrol. On 12 July 1919, it was sunk by a mine while removing minefields in the North Sea.

Design and construction
The early years of the First World War saw the Royal Navy acquire very large numbers of trawlers and drifters for use as minesweepers and patrol boats for the Auxiliary Patrol. By 1916, however, more fishing vessels could not be taken up from trade without causing the commercial fishing fleet to shrink to an unacceptably small size, so the British Admiralty commenced a construction programme of trawlers to meet the navy's needs. Three types of trawler were chosen for mass production, based on successful designs of commercial trawler, with very large numbers (550 were ordered by 1918). One of these types was the Mersey-class, based on Cochrane & Sons' prototype Lord Mersey.

Richard Bulkeley was ordered as Admiralty No. 3560 and built as Yard No. 820 at Cochrane & Sons' Selby shipyard, with a steam engine made by C. D. Holmes & Co. Ltd., Hull. It was launched on 21 August 1917 and completed on 16 November that year.

Service
Richard Bulkeley was loaned to the US Navy on 31 May 1919 for use as a minesweeper.

Sinking
Just before sunset on 12 July 1919, while minesweeping off the Orkney Islands, Richard Bulkeley was sunk by the explosion of a mine (said to be an American Mk VI mine) fouled in the “kite” (Type 7 plunger kite) of her sweep gear.  The , a British-built Castle-class trawler, under the command of Lt. Edwin V. Wilder was able to retrieve twelve survivors from the icy waters. Seven others perished in the incident:
 Comdr. Frank Ragan King
 Engineman 1st Class Floyd Harman
 Fireman 1st Class George M. Sowers
 Fireman 2nd Class George P. Rezab
 Ship's Cook 1st Class Antino Perfidio
 Seaman 2nd Class Homer Perdue
 Seaman 2nd Class John V. Mallon.

Captain King
Commander Frank Ragan King assumed command of the trawler Richard Buckley on 7 July 1919 during minesweeping operations in the North Sea.  On 12 July 1919 his ship struck a mine and went down in only seven minutes. During the crisis, King exerted himself to see that all of his crew might be saved. King's feeling for his men was evidenced by the fact that his final act before going down with his ship was to strap his own life preserver to a stunned sailor and help him over the side. Comdr. King received the Distinguished Service Medal for his valor. The destroyer USS King (DD-242) was named for him.

Bibliography 
Notes

References 

  
 - Total pages: 249 

Ships built in Selby
Maritime incidents in 1919
Shipwrecks in the North Sea
Ships sunk by mines
Mersey-class minesweepers